Heptodonta is a genus of beetles in the family Cicindelidae, containing the following species:

 Heptodonta analis (Fabricius, 1801)
 Heptodonta arrowi (W. Horn, 1900)
 Heptodonta eugenia Chaudoir, 1865
 Heptodonta ferrarii Gestro, 1893
 Heptodonta lumawigi (Wiesner, 1980)
 Heptodonta melanopyga Schaum, 1862
 Heptodonta mindoroensis Cassola, 2000
 Heptodonta positcalis White, 1844
 Heptodonta pulchella (Hope, 1831)
 Heptodonta vermifera (W. Horn, 1908)

References

Cicindelidae